Prince Daewon (대원군, Daewongun) is a 1968 South Korean film directed by Shin Sang-ok. It was chosen as Best Film at the Grand Bell Awards.

Plot
A historical drama depicting power struggles in the last days of the Joseon Dynasty.

Cast
Shin Young-kyun
Kim Ji-mee
Choi Nam-Hyun
Heo Jang-kang
Park Am
Kim Dong-won
Yoon In-Ja
Song Mi-nam
Kim Dong-hun
Gang Mun

Bibliography

Contemporary reviews
1968-04-14. "「동시녹음 첫 실현 <대원군>」". Hankook Ilbo.

References

External links

 

1968 films
Films directed by Shin Sang-ok
Best Picture Grand Bell Award winners
1960s Korean-language films
South Korean biographical drama films
South Korean historical drama films
1960s biographical drama films
1960s historical drama films